Felsina is a monotypic genus of African crab spiders containing the single species, Felsina granulum. It was first described by Eugène Louis Simon in 1895, and is found in Africa.

See also
 List of Thomisidae species

References

Monotypic Araneomorphae genera
Spiders of Africa
Thomisidae